Myrmecophilus manni is a species in the family Myrmecophilidae ("ant crickets"), in the order Orthoptera ("grasshoppers, crickets, katydids"). Common names are "desert ant cricket" and "Mann's ant cricket".
Myrmecophilus manni is found in North America.

References

Further reading
 American Insects: A Handbook of the Insects of America North of Mexico, Ross H. Arnett. 2000. CRC Press.
 Field Guide To Grasshoppers, Katydids, And Crickets Of The United States, Capinera, Scott, Walker. 2004. Cornell University Press.
 Otte, Daniel (1994). Crickets (Grylloidea). Orthoptera Species File 1, 120.

External links
NCBI Taxonomy Browser, Myrmecophilus manni

Crickets
Insects described in 1911